The flag of Acre is one of the official symbols of the state of Acre, Brazil. The current flag was introduced by Law No. 1170 of 22 December 1995 (pt), adopting the design of the flag of the Republic of Acre (Decree No. 2 of 15 July 1899), as modified by Resolution No. 5 of 24 January 1921. The faixa governamental (pt) used by the Chief Executive of Acre is made up of the colors of the flag, and also boasts the red star.

Her design consists of a rectangle ratio of width-length 7:10, divided by a diagonal line from the bottom left (hoist-side) to the upper right. The top left is yellow with a red star in the corner, and the bottom right is green.

Symbolism 
The main colors of the flag (green and yellow) are the same as the flag of Brazil and represent the state's integration with Brazil. Independently, each color has the following meaning:

 The yellow represents the riches of the earth;
 The green represents hope.

The red star in the upper left, called the "Altaneira Star", represents the blood of those who fought for the annexation of the current state of Acre to Brazil. The flag was officially adopted by the governor Epaminondas Jácome (pt).

References

Flags of Brazil
Flags introduced in 1995
1995 establishments in Brazil
Acre (state)
Acre